Yis or YIS may refer to:
 Yi people
 Yis language
 Yishun MRT station (station abbreviation YIS), Singapore
 Yokohama International School
 Yangon International School